Peto Galim is a Malaysian politician who has served as the State Assistant Minister of Agriculture, Fisheries and Food Industries of Sabah in the Gabungan Rakyat Sabah (GRS) administration under Chief Minister Hajiji Noor and Minister Jeffrey Kitingan since January 2023 and Member of the Sabah State Legislative Assembly (MLA) for Inanam since September 2020. He is a member of the People's Justice Party (PKR), a component party of the Pakatan Harapan (PH) coalition. He has served as the Division Chief of PKR of Sepanggar since July 2022.

Election result

References 

21st-century Malaysian politicians
Place of birth missing (living people)
People's Justice Party (Malaysia) politicians
Members of the Sabah State Legislative Assembly
Living people
Year of birth missing (living people)